The estuarine triplefin or the cockabully (Forsterygion nigripenne) is a species of triplefin blenny in the genus Forsterygion. It was described by Achille Valenciennes in 1836. It is found in the Southwest Pacific, throughout New Zealand.

References

Estuarine triplefin
Fish described in 1836